I Hate Christian Laettner is a 2015 ESPN 30 for 30 documentary directed by Rory Karpf.

Summary
It examines the love/hate relationship towards Duke University basketball player Christian Laettner, and explores five factors which the film-makers believe explain the widespread and persistent hatred: privilege, race, bullying, greatness, and physical appearance. It is narrated by Rob Lowe.

Reception
The A.V. Club called it a "too cute approach to one of college basketball's greatest villains" while Variety praised it as "an amusing, affectionate and quite informative look at the hostility directed at the Duke basketball star of the early 1990s."

See also
 Duke–Michigan rivalry, featured in the film
 Fab Five, the key University of Michigan men's basketball players during Laettner's Duke career
 The Fab Five, ESPN documentary on the above group
 Christian Laettner
 The Shot (Duke–Kentucky), also featured in the film

References

External links
 
 
 Laettner's apology on CBS News

Documentary films about basketball
Duke Blue Devils men's basketball
30 for 30
2015 television films
2015 films
2010s American films